The men's Greco-Roman middleweight competition at the 1956 Summer Olympics in Melbourne took place from 3 December to 6 December at the Royal Exhibition Building. Nations were limited to one competitor.

Competition format

This Greco-Roman wrestling competition continued to use the "bad points" elimination system introduced at the 1928 Summer Olympics for Greco-Roman and at the 1932 Summer Olympics for freestyle wrestling, as modified in 1952 (adding medal rounds and making all losses worth three points—from 1936 to 1948 losses by split decision only cost two points). Each round featured all wrestlers pairing off and wrestling one bout (with one wrestler having a bye if there were an odd number). The loser received three points. The winner received one point if the win was by decision and zero points if the win was by fall. At the end of each round, any wrestler with at least five points was eliminated. This elimination continued until the medal rounds, which began when three wrestlers remained. These three wrestlers each faced each other in a round-robin medal round (with earlier results counting, if any had wrestled another before); record within the medal round determined medals, with bad points breaking ties.

Results

Round 1

 Bouts

 Points

Round 2

 Bouts

 Points

Round 3

 Bouts

 Points

Round 4

 Bouts

 Points

Medal rounds

Parfyonov's victory over Dietrich in round 1 counted for the medal rounds. Parfyonov faced Bulgarelli in the medal rounds, winning the bout to secure the gold medal at 2–0 against the other medalists. Dietrich then also defeated Bulgarelli to earn silver at 1–1, with Bulgarelli earning the bronze at 0–2 against the other medalists.

 Bouts

 Points

References

Wrestling at the 1956 Summer Olympics